The 1965 NAIA World Series was the ninth annual tournament hosted by the National Association of Intercollegiate Athletics to determine the national champion of baseball among its member colleges and universities in the United States and Canada.

The tournament was played at Phil Welch Stadium in St. Joseph, Missouri.

Carson–Newman defeated Omaha in the championship series, 3–2, to win the Eagles' first NAIA World Series.

Carson–Newman pitcher, and future MLB All Star, Clyde Wright was named tournament MVP.

Bracket

See also
 1965 NCAA University Division baseball tournament

Reference

NAIA World Series
NAIA World Series
NAIA World Series